Hikaru Yumura (born 18 October 1997) is a Japanese professional footballer who plays as a midfielder for WE League club Chifure AS Elfen Saitama.

Club career 
Yumura made her WE League debut on 12 September 2021.

References 

Japanese women's footballers
Chifure AS Elfen Saitama players
People from Sakai, Osaka
Association football people from Osaka Prefecture
1997 births
Living people
Women's association football midfielders
WE League players